Peter Salway, FSA (born 1932) is a British historian, who specialises in Roman Britain. He lectured at the universities of Durham, Cambridge, Bristol and Oxford, before becoming Professor of the History and Archaeology of Roman Britain at the Open University.

Early life
From 1951 to 1958, Salway studied at Sidney Sussex College, Cambridge. He gained a Bachelor of Arts (BA) that was later promoted to Master of Arts (MA), and a Doctor of Philosophy (PhD).

Academic career
From 1956 to 1957, Salway was the Sir James Knott Research Fellow at King's College, a University of Durham college in Newcastle. He returned to Sidney Sussex College, Cambridge as a fellow from 1957 to 1964. While there, he served as Praelector and then Dean. He was a Senior Lecturer at the University of Bristol from 1964 to 1965. He was also Warden of Hiatt Baker Hall, one of the university's halls of residence.

In 1965, Salway joined All Souls College, Oxford as domestic bursar. He served in that role until 1969 when he was elected a Quondam Fellow of the College. In 1970, he joined the Open University as Regional Director for the West Midlands. From 1983 to 1989, he was also Professor of the History and Archaeology of Roman Britain.

Salway retired in 1991 and was appointed an Emeritus Fellow of the Open University. He remains a Quondam Fellow of All Souls College, Oxford.

Salway is the author of Roman Britain (1981), a volume in the Oxford History of England series.

Honours
On 7 January 1960, Salway was elected a Fellow of the Society of Antiquaries (FSA).

Selected works

References

Living people
Fellows of Sidney Sussex College, Cambridge
Fellows of All Souls College, Oxford
Academics of the Open University
1932 births
Fellows of the Society of Antiquaries of London
Academics of the University of Bristol
Academics of Durham University